Dypsis faneva is a species of flowering plant in the  Arecaceae family. It is a palm endemic to Madagascar, where it grows in rainforests. It is threatened by habitat destruction. Fewer than 70 mature individuals are thought to remain.

References

faneva
Endemic flora of Madagascar
Endangered plants
Taxonomy articles created by Polbot
Taxa named by Henk Jaap Beentje
Flora of the Madagascar lowland forests